This is a list of historical and modern Karnataka literature, arranged in chronological order of the historical polity or era from which the works originated. Karnataka literature originates from the Karnataka region of South India, which roughly corresponds to the modern state of Karnataka. 

This list includes, but is not limited to, works written in the Sanskrit and Kannada languages. Where information is available, the author or authors of the text are listed, followed by the title of the text and the language or languages in which the text is written. Multiple works by the same author are listed separately.

Western Ganga Dynasty (350–1000)

 Pūjyapāda – Sarvārthasiddhi (Sanskrit)
 Jinasena II – Ādipurāṇa (Sanskrit)
 Madhava II – Dattaka Sutrain (Sanskrit)
 Sripurusha – Gajasastra
 Shivamara II – Gajashtaka (Kannada)
Shivamara II – Sethubandha (Prakrit)
 Hemasena or Vidya Dhananjaya – Raghavpandaviya
 Vidhibhasimha – Gadyachintamani 
Vidhibhasimha – Kshatrachudamani
 Guru Nemichandra – Gommatasara
 Chavundaraya – Chavundaraya Purana (Kannada)
Chavundaraya – Charitrasara (Kannada)
Chavundaraya – Trishashti Laksan Puran (Kannada)
 Nagavarma I – Chandombhudhi
 Jinasena I – Harivamsha (Sanskrit)

Rashtrakuta Dynasty (753–982)

 Trivikrama – Nalachampu (Sanskrit)
 Halayudha – Kavirahasya 
Halayudha – Mritasanjivini
 Somadevasuri – Nitikavyamrita
 Mahaviracharya – Ganita-Sara-Samgraha
 Virasenacharya – Jayadhavala-Tika
 Jinasenacharya – Parsvabhyudaya Mahapurana
Jinasenacharya – Dhavala
 Gunabhadra – Uttarapurana (Sanskrit)
 Asaga – Vardhamana Purana (Kannada)
 Amoghavarsha I – Prashottara Ratnamakike  (Kannada)
Amoghavarsha I – Kavirajamarga (Kannada)
 Sri Ponna – Bhuvanaika-Ramabhyudaya (Kannada)
Sri Ponna – Santipurana (Kannada)
Sri Ponna – Jinaksaramale (Kannada)
 Adikavi Pampa – Adipurana (Kannada)
Adikavi Pampa – Vikramarjuna Vijaya (Kannada)
 Shivakotiacharya – Vaddaradhane (Kannada)

Seuna (Yadava) Dynasty (860–1317)

 Kamalabhava – Santhishwarapurana (Kannada)
 Achanna – Varadhamanapurana (Kannada)
 Chundarasa of Pandharapura – Dashakumara Charite (Kannada)

Western Chalukya Empire (973–1189)

 Ranna – Ajitapurana (Kannada)
Ranna – Sahasabhimavijaya (Kannada)
Ranna – Gadayuddha (Kannada)
Ranna – Rannakanda (Kannada)
 Chavundaraya II – Lokopakara (Kannada)
 Chandraraja – Madanatilaka (Kannada)
 Shridharacharya – Jatakatilaka (Kannada)
 Kirtivarma – Govaidya (Kannada)
 Durgasimha – Panchatantra (Kannada)
 Nagavarma – Kavyavalokana (Kannada)
 Brahmashiva – Samayaparikshe (Kannada)
 Vadiraja – Yashodharacharitam (Sanskrit)
Vadiraja – Parshvanatha Charitam (Sanskrit)
 Bilhana – Vikramankadeva Charitha (Sanskrit)
 Vijananeshvara – Mitakshara (Sanskrit)
 Someshwara III – Abhilashithartha Chinthamani or Manasollasa (Sanskrit) 
Someshwara III – Chandraprabhacharite (Sanskrit)
 Jagadekamalla – Sangithachudamani (Sanskrit)
 Jagaddala Somanatha – Karnataka Kalyanakaraka (Kannada)
 Karnaparya – Neminatha Purana (Kannada)
 Nayasena – Dharmamrita (Kannada)
 Brahmasiva – Samayaparikshe (Kannada)
 Shantiraja – Sukumaracharita (Kannada)
 Vritta Vilasa – Translation of Sanskrit text Dharama Parikshe (Kannada)
 Nagavarma II – Kavyavalokana (Kannada)
Nagavarma II – Bhashabhushana (Kannada)
Nagavarma II – Abhidana Vastukosha (Kannada)

Hoysala Empire (950–1343)

 Madhvacharya – Sarvamula Granthas (Sanskrit)
 Vidyatirtha – Rudraprashnabhashya (Sanskrit)
 Nagachandra – Ramachandra Charitapurana (Kannada)  
Nagachandra – Mallinathapurana (Kannada)
 Harihara – Girija Kalyana (Kannada) 
Harihara – Basavarajadevara Ragale (Kannada)
 Raghavanka – Harischandra Kavya (Kannada)
Raghavanka – Siddhara Chanitra (Kannada)
Raghavanka – Veeresha Charite (Kannada)
Raghavanka – Sharabha Charitre (Kannada)
Raghavanka – Somanathacharita (Kannada)
Raghavanka – Harihara Mahatwa (Kannada)
 Janna – Yashodhara Charite (Kannada)
Janna – Ananthanatha Purana (Kannada)
 Nemichandra – Leelavati (Kannada)
Nemichandra – Neminatha Purana (Kannada)
 Achanna – Vardhamana Purana 
 Rudrabhatta – Jagannatha Vijaya (Kannada)
 Mallikarjuna – Sukti (Kannada)
Mallikarjuna – Sudharnava (Kannada)
 Kesiraja – Shabdamanidarpana (Kannada)
 Hastimalla – Adipurana (Kannada)
 Andayya – Vardhamana Purana (Kannada)
Andayya – Kabbigarakava (Kannada) 
 Choundarasa – Abhinava Dasha Kumara Charitha (Kannada)
Choundarasa – Nala Champu (Kannada)
 Rajaditya – Kshetraganita (Kannada)
Rajaditya – Vyavaharaganita (Kannada)
Rajaditya – Lilavati (Kannada)
 Ratta Kavi – Rata-Mata (Kannada)
 Bandhuvarma – Neminatha Purana (Kannada)
Bandhuvarma – Harivamsha (Kannada)
 Mahabalakavi – Neminatha Purana (Kannada)
 Padmarasa – Dikshabodhe (Kannada)
 Hastimalla – Adipurana
 Trivikrama – Ushaharana (Sanskrit)
 Narayana Pandita – Madhwavijaya (Sanskrit)
Narayana Pandita – Manimanjari (Sanskrit)
Narayana Pandita – Parijataharana (Sanskrit)
 Vidyacharkarvartin II – Rukminikalyana (Sanskrit)

Kalachuri dynasty (1164–1181), Virashaiva Saints and Vachanakaras

 Basavanna (known as Basaveshvara wrote the spiritual lyrics vachanas – Kannada)
 Madivala Machayya (vachanakara – Kannada)
 Madara Channayya (vachanakara – Kannada)
 Sakalesha Madarasa (vachanakara – Kannada)
 Ramanna (vachanakara – Kannada)
 Sujikayakada Ramitande (vachanakara – Kannada)
 Medara Ketayya (vachanakara – Kannada)
 Kayakada Basappa (vachanakara – Kannada)
 Virupaksha Pandita – (Chennabasavapurana – Kannada) 
 Dharani Pandita – (Bijjalarayacharite – Kannada)
 Chandrasagara Varni (Bijjalarayapurana – Kannada)

Vijayanagara Empire (1336–1646), Kannada Haridasa Sahitya

 Kumara Vyasa (1430 AD) (Gadugina Bharata or Karnataka Bharata KathaManjari a Kannada adaptation of Mahabharata and Airavata. His title was Rupaka Samrajya Chakravarti (Emperor of the World of Metaphors).) 
 Narahri or Kumara Valmiki (1500 AD) (Torave Ramayana in Kannada & Smriti Kaustubha in Sanskrit)
 Vittalanatha (Bhagavatha) – Kannada
 Ratnakarvarni (16th century) (Bharatesha Vaibhava, Triloka Sataka, Someswara Sataka) – Kannada
 Nanjunda – Kumara Rama Charita (16th century) – Kannada
 BhimaKavi – Basavapurana(1369 AD) – Kannada
 Padmanaka – Kannada
 Kereya Padmarasa – Padmaraja Purana (1385 AD) – Kannada
 Lakkana Dandesa  Shivatatwa Chintamani (1428 AD) – Kannada
 Gubbi Mallanacharya – Veerasaivamrita (1513 AD)  – Kannada 
 Singiraja – Kannada
 Chamarasa (Prabhulinga Leele) – Kannada
 Akalanka (16th century), Jain scholar – Kannada
 Bhattakalaka (16th century) – Kannada grammarian
 Mangaraja (1360 AD) (Khagendra-Mani-Darpana, work on poisons and antidotes) – Kannada 
 Sayana (Vedartha Prakasha, Yajnatantra Sudhanidhi, Prayaschitra Sudhanidhi and Purushartha Sudhanidhi) – Sanskrit
 Madhava Vidyaranya  (Parasara – Madhaviya, Sarva-darshana-samgraha) – Sanskrit
 Devanna Bhatta (Smriti Chandrika) – Sanskrit
 Gangadevi (Poet, Madhura Vijayam) – Sanskrit
 Tirumalamba Devi (Poet, Varadambika Parinayam) – Sanskrit
 Krishnadevaraya (Madalasa Charita, Satyavadu Parinaya& Rasamanjari – Sanskrit
 Ramaraja (Bakhair – Battle of Talikota – Persian??)
 Timmanna Kavi, patronised by king Krishnadevaraya, Kannada
 Kereya Padmarasa,  Padmaraja Purana – Kannada 
 Linganna, Keladinripavijayam – Kannada
 Unknown author, Krishnadevarayana Dinachari is a recent discovery in Kannada.
 Chatu Vithalanatha, Kannada
 Madhura, Kannada 
 Salva
 Mallanarya,  Veerasaivamrita – Kannada
 Lakkana Dandesa,  Shivatatwa Chintamani – Kannada
 Shivagna Prasadi Mahadevayya and Halageyadeva, Shunya Sampadane – Kannada
 Kallumathada Prabhuva – Kannada
 Jakkanna – Kannada
 Maggeya Mayideva – Kannada
 Tontada Siddalingayati – Kannada

Haridasa
 Purandaradasa (1484–1564 AD) (Father of Carnatic music. Composed 475,000 songs in Kannada. His titles wereDasaShreshta Purandaropanishat, Sangitapitamaha)
 Kanakadasa (1509–1607 AD) (Padas and Keertans 
RamadhyanaCharite, Haribhakthisara, Kalacharithre, 
Mohana Tarangini, Nalacharitre – Kannada)
 Narahari Thirtha 
 Padmanabha Thirtha 
 Akshobhya Thirtha 
 Jayatirtha – Nyaya sudha, Tattva prakashika, Prameya deepika, Nyaya deepika Important works
 Sripadaraya of Mulbagal (1500 AD)
 Vyasatirtha (1447 – 1539 AD) – Guru of Purandaradasa, Kanakadasa and Krishnadevaraya wrote Nyayamritam, Tarkatandava, Tatparya Chandrika Important Works 
 Sri Vadirajaswami

Later Haridasa

 Guru Raghavendra Swami (1600–1671 AD) the great Sage of Manthralaya.Important works
 Vijaya Dasa (1687–1755 AD) 
 Mohana Dasa 
 Gopala Dasa (1721–1762 AD)
 Helavanakatte Giriyamma 
 Jagannatha Dasa (1728–1809 AD) (Harikathamrithasara, Uga Bhogas, Keerthanas and Tathva Suvalis– Kannada)

Kannada literature from Mysore Kingdom, Keladi Nayaka kingdom

 Basappanayaka (Shivatatwa Ratnakara – History Keladi Kings)
 Linganna (Keladi Napra Vijaya– History of Keladi Kings)
 Chikkupadhyaya, Minister and teacher of His Highness Sri Chikkadevaraja Wodeyar (1670 AD) – more than 30 works in Kannada
 Tirumalaraya (1680 CE) (Chikkadevaraja Vijayam, Chikkadevaraja Vamshaavali – History of Mysore Kings) 
 Govinda Vaidya (1648 CE) (Narasaraja Vijaya – History of Mysore Kings) 
 Bhattakalanka Deva (1604 AD) (Karnataka Shabdaushasana on grammar)
 Sakdakshara Deva (1657 AD) (Rajshekhara Vilasa – romantic champu)
 Noorondayya (1740 AD) (Soundara Kavya) 
 Nijaguna Yogi (1650 AD) (Viveka Chintamani – Shaiva work)
 Nanja Raja (1760 AD) (Shiva Bhakti Mahatmya and Hari Vamsa – Puranic works) 
 Brahma Kavi (Samaya Pariksha)
 Sarvajna (1650 AD) (tripadis or vachanas pithy three lined poems in Kannada)

Kannada literature from old Bangalore (18th century – 20th century) 

18th-century Kannada
 Guru Nanjesh (Jayastuti)
 Ekambara Dikshit (Veerabhdra Vijaya)
 Jayaram Pande (Radha Madhava Vilasa)
 Mudduveeraswamy (1700 AD) (Vachanakara)
 Sarpabhooshana Shivayogi (1795–1839 AD) (Vachanakara)
 Mahant Desika (Vachanakara)
 Jeerage Basavalingacharya (Vachanakara)

19th-century Kannada (topics: grammar, linguistics, Jain and Virashaiva philosophy, geology, agriculture, politics)
 Siddhanti Velanada
 Subramanya Shastri
 Siddhanti Shivakumara Shastri
 Srinivasa
 Nagasharma
 Dakshinamurthy Shastri
 Padmaraja Bhramasuri
 Ramanathapuram Raguraya
 S. N. Narasimhaiah
 Doddabele Narayana Shastri – commentary on Jaimini Bharatha, Sundarakhanda, translations of Kalidasa works

20th-century Kannada
 Bidare Ashwatha Narayana shastri (Dhammapada)
 B. Puttiah (printing technology)
 Panyam Sudarashastri (a translation of Bhasa Dharma)
 S.K. Nasasimhaiya (biography of Magadi Kempe Gowda)
 Toppulu Raghavacharya (translation of commentary on Gita)
 Mahant desika (Yakshagana composition)
 Balasaraswati (first detective novel)
 Mahadevaswamy (nicknamed Abhinava Allama)
 Pt. Shivakumar Swamy
 Siddalingaswamy of Beli Matha
 Nanjundaswamy of Guruvanna Matha
 Pt. B. Shivamurty Shastri

20th-century Sanskrit Keerthanakaras
 Singeri NarasimhaShastri
 M. Lakshminarasimha Shastri
 Varada Desikachar
 Jaggu Vakulabhushana
 Rariapalli Anantha Krishna Sharma
 Motaganahalli Subramanya Shastri
 
 20th-century harikathe dasaru
  Gururajulu Naidu
  Sant Keshava Das
  Bhadragiri Achuth Das
  Malur Sonnappa
  Muiratnam Mudaliar

Modern Kannada poets, scholars and writers

Sahitya Academy Awardees
 1955 Kuvempu (K. V. Puttappa) Sri Ramayana Darsanam (epic)
 1956 R. S. Mugali Kannada Sahitya Charitre (history of literature) 
 1958 D. R. Bendre Aralu-Maralu (poetry)
 1959 K. Shivaram Karanth Yakshagana Bayalata (a treatise on folk-drama) 
 1960 'Vinayaka' (V. K. Gokak) Dyava-Prithvi (poetry)
 1961 A. R. Krishnashastry Bengali Kadambarikara Bankim Chandra (a critical study) 
 1962 Devudu Narasimha Sastri Mahakshatriya (novel)
 1964 B. Puttaswamayya Kranti-Kalyana (novel)
 1965 S. V. Ranganna Ranga Binnapa (philosophical reflections)
 1966 P. T. Narasimhachar Hamsa Damayanti Mattu Itara Rupakagalu (musical plays)
 1967 D. V. Gundappa Shrimad Bhagavadgita Tatparya Athava Jivanandharmayoga (philosophical expositions) 
 1968 'Srinivasa' (Masti Venkatesha Iyengar) Sannakathegalu (12–13) (short stories)
 1969 H. Tipperudraswamy Karnataka Samskriti Sameekshe (cultural study) 
 1970 S. B. Joshi Karnataka Samskritiya Poorva Peethike (cultural study)
 1971 Adya Rangacharya Kalidasa (literary criticism) 
 1972 S. S. Bhoosnurmath Shoonyasampadaneya Paramarshe (commentary) 
 1973 V. Sitaramiah Aralu Baralu (poetry) 
 1974 Gopalakrishna Adiga Vardhamaana (poetry) 
 1975 S. L. Bhyrappa Daatu (novel)
 1975 L. Gundappa Translations from Tamil, Sanskrit to Kannada 
 1976 M. Shivaram Mana Manthana (psychiatric studies)
 1977 K. S. Narasimhaswamy Tereda Baagilu (poetry)
 1978 B. G. L. Swamy Hasuru Honnu (travelogue) 
 1979 A. N. Murthy Rao Chitragalu Patragalu
 1980 Gorur Ramaswamy Iyengar Americadalli Goruru (travelogue) 
 1981 Chennaveera Kanavi Jeewa Dhwani (poetry) 
 1982 Chanduranga Vyshakha (novel) 
 1983 Yashwant Chittal Katheyaadalu Hudugi (short stories) 
 1984 G. S. Shivarudrappa Kavyartha Chintana (literary criticism) 
 1985 T. R. Subba Rao Durgaasthamaana (novel)
 1986 Vyasaraya Ballal Bandaaya (novel) 
 1987 K.P. Poornachandra Tejaswi Chidambara Rahasya (novel) 
 1988 Shankar Mokashi Punekar Avadheshwari (novel) 
 1989 H. M. Nayak Samprati (belles lettres) 
 1990 Devanur Mahadeva Kusuma Bale (novel) 
 1991 Chandrashekhara Kambara Sirisampige (play)
 1992 Subbanna Ekkundi Bakulada Hoovugalu (poetry)
 1993 P. Lankesh Kallu Karaguva Samaya (short stories) 
 1994 Girish Raghunath Karnad Tale Danda (play) 
 1995 Kirtinath Kurtkoti Uriya Nalage (criticism) 
 1996 G. S. Amur Bhuvanada Bhagya (literary criticism) 
 1997 M. Chidananda Murthy Hosatu Hosatu (criticism) 
 1998 B.C. Ramchandra Sharma Sapthapadi (poetry) 
 1999 D. R. Nagaraj Sahitya Kathana (essays) 
 2000 Shantinath Kuberappa Desai Om Namo (novel) 
 2001 L. S. Sheshagiri Rao English Sahitya Charitre (literary history) 
 2002 Sujana (S. Narayana Shetty) Yugasandhya (epic) 
 2003 K. V. Subbanna Kaviraja Marga Mattu Kannada, Jagattu (essays)
 2004 Geetha Nagabhushana Baduku (novel)
 2005 Raghavendra Patil Teru (novel)

Kendra Sahitya Academy Awardees (translation)

2005 Dr. Panchakshari Hiremath, Urdu to Kannada
Saraswati Samman Awardee
S. L. Bhyrappa

Other eminent writers

 Panje Mangesh Rao
 De. Javare Gowda
 Annadanayya Puranik – Vachanas, Law, Shiva Sharana literature
 Siddayya Puranik – Vachanas, Shiva Sharana literature
 Chandrika Puranik – Shiva Sharana literature
 Udaya Shankar Puranik – science and technology, columnist
 Haldoderi Sudhindra – columnist
 Pandit Kallinath Shastri Puranik – 12 Puranas and Ayurveda
 Basavaraj Puranik – Shiva Sharana literature
 Samethanahalli Rama Rao (Raasa)
 Anupama Niranjana 
 B. M. Srikanthaiah (B. M. Sri)  
 Dr. A. N. Krishna Rao (Anakru)  
 G. P. Rajarathnam 
 G. B. Joshi (JadaBharata) 
 M Govinda Pai 
 M. V. Seetaramiah 
 Nisar Ahmed K. S.
 P. Lankesh 
 Dr. Panchakshari Hiremath
 SAADHANE-RajguruGuruswamiKalikeri (Poetry, research, legends, biographies and lyrics)
 S. V. Parameshwara Bhatta  
 T. P. Kailasam – drama
 Tha. Ra. Subbarao 
 Thee. Nam. Shree 
 R. K. Narayan, author 
 R. K. Laxman, cartoonist & humorist
 Kamala Markhandaya
 Triveni  (Sharapanjara), novelist
 G. P. Rajaratnam (Ratnana Padagalu)
 Beechi – humorist
 Dr M.Shivaram, Rashi – humorist
 T. Sunandamma – humorist
 H. L. Nage Gowda – folklorist
 Go Ru Chennabsappa (Go Ru Cha) – Janapada Saahithya & Sharana Saahithya 
 Anakaru – novelist
 M. Ramamurthy
 K. V. Iyer
 Devudu
 Niranjana
 Na. Kasturi
 Navaratna Rama Rao
 T. T. Sharma – journalism
 VeeraKesari
 Siddavanahalli Krishna Sharma
Hariharapriya
 R. Kalyanamma
 Tirumale Rajamma
 Ambabai
 H. V. Savitramma
 H. S. Parvathi
 Chi. Na. Mangala
 H. R. Indira
 M. K. Indira
 M. V. Kanakamma
 Nirupama
 N. Pankaja
 Usha Navaratna Ram
 Kakolu Saroja Rao
 Anupama Niranjana
 Vi. Seetharamiah, poet, critic
 Basavaraja Kattimani
 Nanjanagudu Tirumalamba (author)
 Sundar V. Nadkarni, fiction writer and poet
 Ta. Raa.Subba Rao, novelist
 Veenaa Shantheshvara, short story writer
 Vaidehi, short story writer
 Sumangala, short story writer
 Dr K. R. Sandhya Reddy, poet, story writer, folk literature
 T. K. Venkatesh Prabhu – novelist & poet
 A. N. Prahlada Rao Kannada crossword writer
 Pratibha Nandakumar, poet
 D. R. Nagraj, critic
 K. V. Narayana, literary critic and linguist
 B. C. Ramachandra Sharma, poet and fictionist
 Shanhinatha Desai, novelist, story writer
 Kum. Veerabhadrappa, novelist, story writer
 Gowri Lankesh, columnist
 Vishweswara Bhat, columnist
 Abdul Raheem Teekay, Writer
 Ravi Hanj, columnist
 B. V. Veerabhadrappa, columnist
 Dr. N. Someswara, health writer
 N. Narasimhaiah – detective novelist
 A. N. Murthy Rao
Dr. S. R. Ramaswamy, journalist
Ba. Na. Sundara Rao, author and journalist
 Shivarudraprasad, poet and columnist

Literature originating from Christian missionaries
 Rev. John Garet (translated Bible, Bhagavadgita, Panchatantra, Shabda Manidarpana to Kannada)
 Daniel Sanderson (translated Jaimini Bharata to English)
 Thomas Hodson
 Ellis Robert
 Rev. B. L Rice
 Edward Peter Rice

See also
Kannada language
Kannada literature
Karnataka
Jnanpith Award

References

 Dr. Suryanath U. Kamat, A Concise history of Karnataka from pre-historic times to the present, Jupiter Books, MCC, Bangalore, 2001 (Reprinted 2002), 
 Prof K.A. Nilakanta Sastri, History of South India, From Prehistoric times to fall of Vijayanagar, 1955, OUP, New Delhi (Reprinted 2002),  
 R. Narasimhacharya, History of Kannada Literature, 1988, Asian Educational Services, New Delhi, Madras, 1988, .
 Ramachandra Sidenur, Karmanye Vadhi Karaste, 2004, Dharwad.

External links
 History of Karnataka, Arthikaje 
 History of Kannada Literature, Dr. Jyotsna Kamat
 
 Dvaita saints

Kannada literature

Culture of Karnataka
History of literature in India
Indian literature-related lists
literature